Arkadiusz Bąk (born 6 October 1974) is a Polish former footballer.

Career

Club
Having started in the 1992/1993 season, Bąk also played for Ruch Chorzów, Polonia Warsaw, Birmingham City, Widzew Łódź and Amica Wronki. In 2000 he won the title with Polonia. In 2008, he joined Flota Świnoujście from Lech Poznań.

International
He made thirteen appearances for Poland, including appearances in the 2002 Football World Cup in South Korea.

After retirement
After retiring from playing he emigrated to Norway, and works as a youth coach and working on ski slopes.

References

External links

 
 

1974 births
Birmingham City F.C. players
2002 FIFA World Cup players
Lech Poznań players
Living people
Poland international footballers
Polish footballers
Polish expatriate footballers
Polonia Warsaw players
Ruch Chorzów players
Widzew Łódź players
Lechia Gdańsk players
Ekstraklasa players
Expatriate footballers in England
People from Stargard
Sportspeople from West Pomeranian Voivodeship
Association football midfielders